Edward Vincent may refer to:

 Edward Vincent Jr. (1934–2012), legislator and mayor of Inglewood, California 
 Edward Vincent Jr. Park, formerly Centinela Park, a 55-acre recreation area in Inglewood, named after the mayor
 Edward A. Vincent (c. 1825–1856), architect, cartographer and civil engineer
 Edward F. Vincent (1881–1940), New York assemblyman